Stipe Miocic (born August 19, 1982) is an American professional mixed martial artist. He currently competes in the Heavyweight division in the Ultimate Fighting Championship (UFC), where he is a former two-time UFC Heavyweight Champion. Miocic is widely regarded by critics, commentators and media as the greatest UFC heavyweight fighter of all time. As of March 13, 2023, he is #2 in the UFC heavyweight rankings.

Having successfully defended his title four times during his two title reigns, he holds the record for most wins in heavyweight title fights along with the longest title defending streak in the heavyweight division, at three consecutive defenses. Miocic holds the record for fight-night bonus awards, with nine, the most in the UFC heavyweight division's history.

Prior to his MMA career, Miocic was a former Golden Gloves boxing champion and NCAA Division I wrestler at Cleveland State University.

Early life 
He was born and raised in Euclid, Ohio, on August 19, 1982, the son of Croatian immigrants Kathy and Bojan Miocic. His father originates from Rtina, while his mother is from Cetingrad, Croatia. His parents separated when he was still a child and he continued to live with his mother, initially with grandparents, and later lived with his stepfather and younger half-brother Jonathan.

Since childhood, his mother encouraged his involvement in sports. Miocic played baseball and American football and wrestled while at Eastlake North High School. He received interest from Major League Baseball teams during his collegiate years at Cleveland State University and Trevecca Nazarene University. He also played Division II baseball at Coker College his junior year of college. 

While wrestling in the 197 lbs weight class for Cleveland State Vikings, Miocic competed in the 2003 NCAA Division I Wrestling Championships in Kansas City.

At Trevecca, Miocic was a well-liked student majoring in communication studies. As a member of Jeff Forehand's baseball team, he hit .344 with seven home runs in his senior year and helped the Trojans win the 2005 TranSouth Athletic Conference regular season and tournament titles. None of his teammates at Trevecca are surprised by his success in MMA. He graduated from Trevecca Nazarene University. He majored in marketing and communications at CSU.

Mixed martial arts career

Early career 
During his school days, in 2005, he was brought as a training partner to wrestle with Dan Bobish in Strong Style MMA Training Centre, in Independence, Ohio. Miocic at the time trained various sports (wrestling and baseball), to once again come train with them after finishing his paramedic education at Cuyahoga Community College. He initially trained in mixed martial arts but soon changed to boxing. His coach Marcus Marinelli recalled that although he trained only for several months he was beating boxers with much more experience. After only eight months of training with a background of being a Cleveland Golden Gloves boxing champion (reaching quarter-final in the nationals), and NCAA Division I wrestler at Cleveland State, Miocic began his MMA career by winning his first six fights by knockout. He initially fought for NAAFS (an Ohio-based MMA promotion), where he won the NAAFS Heavyweight Championship.

Ultimate Fighting Championship 
On June 14, 2011, it was announced that Miocic had signed a multi-fight deal with the UFC.

Miocic made his UFC debut against Joey Beltran on October 8, 2011, at UFC 136 and won the fight via unanimous decision (29–28, 30–27, and 29–28).

Miocic faced Phil De Fries on February 15, 2012, at UFC on Fuel TV: Sanchez vs. Ellenberger. Miocic won the fight via first-round KO, and in the process won a "Knockout of the Night" award.

Miocic faced promotional newcomer Shane del Rosario on May 26, 2012, at UFC 146. He won via TKO (elbows) in the second round.

Miocic faced Stefan Struve on September 29, 2012, at UFC on Fuel TV 5. He lost the fight via TKO in the second round. The performance earned both participants "Fight of the Night" honors.

Miocic was scheduled to face returning veteran Soa Palelei on June 15, 2013, at UFC 161. After an injury to UFC 161 headliner Renan Barao, the card was slightly reshuffled. Miocic was paired with Roy Nelson. Miocic, as a significant betting underdog, defeated Nelson via unanimous decision (30–27, 30–27, and 30–27).

Miocic faced Gabriel Gonzaga on January 25, 2014, at UFC on Fox 10. He won the fight via unanimous decision (30–27, 30–27, and 29–28).

Miocic was expected to face Junior dos Santos on May 24, 2014, at UFC 173. However, the bout was shifted a bit and was expected take place a week later on May 31, 2014, at The Ultimate Fighter Brazil 3 Finale. On May 5, 2014, dos Santos pulled out of the fight, citing a hand injury and was replaced by Fábio Maldonado. Miocic won the fight by TKO due to punches early in the first round and received a "Performance of the Night" bonus as well.

A rescheduled bout with dos Santos eventually took place as the main event at UFC on Fox 13 on December 13, 2014. Miocic lost the back-and-forth fight by unanimous decision. The performance earned both participants "Fight of the Night" honors.

Miocic faced Mark Hunt on May 10, 2015, at UFC Fight Night 65. Miocic won the one-sided fight via TKO in the fifth round. At the time of the stoppage, Miocic was ahead on all three scorecards (40–36, 40–35, and 40–34). Miocic set a UFC record for the most strikes landed in a fight and largest strike margin, outlanding Hunt 361–48 over the duration of the bout.

Miocic was expected to face Ben Rothwell on October 24, 2015, at UFC Fight Night 76. However, Miocic pulled out of the fight on October 13 citing injury. Subsequently, Rothwell was removed from the card the following day after the promotion deemed that a suitable opponent could not be arranged on short notice. In turn, Miocic was quickly rebooked and faced Andrei Arlovski in a title eliminator on January 2, 2016, at UFC 195. Miocic defeated Arlovski via TKO at 0:54 in the first round. The win also earned him his second "Performance of the Night" bonus award.

Miocic was briefly scheduled to replace the injured Cain Velasquez and fight Fabrício Werdum for the UFC Heavyweight Championship on February 6, 2016, at UFC Fight Night 82. On January 25, 2016, the day after this announcement, Werdum pulled out of the fight with a back injury.

UFC Heavyweight Championship 

Miocic eventually faced Werdum at UFC 198 on May 14, 2016. He caught Werdum with a short right hook counter while backpedaling away from a flurry of punches in the first round, earning the championship and giving Werdum his first defeat since June 2011. He was also awarded a Performance of the Night bonus.

On September 10, 2016, Miocic made his first title defense at UFC 203 against Alistair Overeem. Although he got knocked down early in the fight, he came back quickly and won via knockout in the first round. Both participants were awarded Fight of the Night honors.

Miocic made his second title defense against Junior dos Santos on May 13, 2017, at UFC 211 in a rematch. Dos Santos previously beat Miocic by a close unanimous decision at UFC on Fox: dos Santos vs. Miocic in 2014. However, this time Miocic started strong and took control of the octagon early. Despite taking hard kicks to the shin, Miocic landed powerful punches with devastating accuracy to drop dos Santos, he then followed up with ground and pound to win the fight via TKO midway through the first round. The win also earned Miocic his fourth Performance of the Night bonus award.

Miocic faced Francis Ngannou on January 20, 2018, at UFC 220. The fight was anticipated as one of the most exciting in UFC history, and Miocic openly felt disrespected because he never received the amount of promotion and support Ngannou did from UFC. Miocic dominated Ngannou for five rounds using strikes with clinch or ground control following takedowns, winning by unanimous decision and breaking the record for most consecutive title defenses for the heavyweight championship with his third successful defense. When he was announced as the winner, instead of the usual practice, he took the belt from Dana White and had his coach Marcus Marinelli put it around him. Miocic received congratulations from both the President Kolinda Grabar-Kitarović and Prime Minister of Croatia Andrej Plenković.

For his fourth title defense, Miocic faced UFC Light Heavyweight Champion Daniel Cormier on July 7, 2018, in the main event at UFC 226. The champion vs. champion matchup was billed as "The Superfight". Miocic was the favorite heading into the bout, mainly due to his natural size and power advantage as well as his dangerous striking on the feet. He lost the fight via knockout in the first round, ending his championship reign. The knockout came in controversial fashion, as Cormier was warned multiple times by referee Marc Goddard for extending his fingers towards Miocic's face and poking him in the eye.

A rematch between Miocic and Daniel Cormier took place on August 17, 2019, at UFC 241 for the UFC Heavyweight Championship. Miocic won the fight by TKO in the fourth round after landing several clean left hooks to the body and following it up with punches to the head, reclaiming the title. This win earned him the Performance of the Night award. Miocic would not return to action until 2020 after suffering retinal damage in the fight due to Cormier accidentally poking him in the eye during the fight.

On June 9, 2020, it was announced that the trilogy bout between Miocic and Cormier was signed to take place at UFC 252 on August 15, 2020. Miocic won the fight via unanimous decision, this time with both fighters receiving eye pokes during the fight.

Miocic faced Francis Ngannou in a rematch on March 27, 2021, at UFC 260. He lost the title via knockout in the second round.

After Jon Jones' victory over Ciryl Gane at UFC 285 secured Jones the UFC Heavyweight Championship, UFC President Dana White announced that Miocic will face Jones in a championship bout. The bout is expected to take place during International Fight Week in early July 2023.

Personal life 
Miocic works as a part-time firefighter paramedic in Oakwood and Valley View, Ohio. He considers it possible that he will become a full-time firefighter once he retires from MMA. When asked by Joe Rogan why he still works as a firefighter despite being a UFC champion, he stated that he needs something to fall back to after his fighting career is over. He married Ryan Marie Carney on June 18, 2016, at the Divine Word Catholic Church in Kirtland, Ohio. On January 20, 2018, Miocic announced that the couple are expecting their first child. His daughter, Meelah, was born in 2018. They welcomed their second child, a boy named Mateo Cruz, on August 28, 2021 as announced on Miocic's instagram by Bruce Buffer.

Miocic can understand Croatian, though he is not fluent and has been learning the language.

On November 22, 2022, Miocic announced the death of his father.

Championships and accomplishments

Mixed martial arts 
Ultimate Fighting Championship
UFC Heavyweight Championship (Two times)
Four successful title defenses (overall)
Three successful title defenses (first reign)
One successful title defense (second reign)
Fight of the Night (Three times) vs. Stefan Struve,  Junior dos Santos and   Alistair Overeem
Performance of the Night (Five times) vs. Fábio Maldonado, Andrei Arlovski, Fabrício Werdum,  Junior dos Santos and  Daniel Cormier
Knockout of the Night (One time) vs. Philip De Fries
Most consecutive UFC Heavyweight Championship defenses (three)
Most UFC Heavyweight Championship defenses (four)
Tied (with Randy Couture) for most wins in UFC Heavyweight title fights (six)
Most head strikes landed in a fight (330) vs. Mark Hunt
Most post-fight bonus awards in UFC heavyweight division (9)
UFC Honors 2019 Comeback of the Year vs. Daniel Cormier
North American Allied Fight Series
NAAFS Heavyweight Championship (One time)
MMAJunkie.com
2014 December Fight of the Month vs. Junior dos Santos
2019 Comeback Fighter of the Year
Sherdog
2015 Beatdown of the Year vs. Mark Hunt
Fight Matrix
MMA Heavyweight Lineal Champion (Two times)
MMADNA.nl
2016 Fighter of the Year.
World MMA Awards
2019 – July 2020 Comeback of the Year vs. Daniel Cormier at UFC 241

Other 
Greater Cleveland Sports Awards Professional Athlete of the Year (2019)

Mixed martial arts record 

|-
|Loss
|align=center|20–4
|Francis Ngannou
|KO (punch)
|UFC 260
|
|align=center|2
|align=center|0:52
|Las Vegas, Nevada, U.S.
|
|-
|Win
|align=center|20–3
|Daniel Cormier
|Decision (unanimous)
|UFC 252
|
|align=center|5
|align=center|5:00
|Las Vegas, Nevada, U.S.
|
|-
|Win
|align=center|19–3
|Daniel Cormier
|TKO (punches)
|UFC 241
|
|align=center|4
|align=center|4:09
|Anaheim, California, U.S.
|
|-
|Loss
|align=center|18–3
|Daniel Cormier
|KO (punches)
|UFC 226
|
|align=center|1
|align=center|4:33
|Las Vegas, Nevada, U.S.
|
|-
|Win
|align=center|18–2
|Francis Ngannou
|Decision (unanimous)
|UFC 220
|
|align=center|5
|align=center|5:00
|Boston, Massachusetts, U.S.
|
|-
|Win
|align=center|17–2
|Junior dos Santos
|TKO (punches)
|UFC 211
|
|align=center|1
|align=center|2:22
|Dallas, Texas, U.S.
|
|-
|Win
|align=center|16–2
|Alistair Overeem
|KO (punches)
|UFC 203
|
|align=center|1
|align=center|4:27
|Cleveland, Ohio, U.S.
|
|-
|Win
|align=center|15–2
|Fabrício Werdum
|KO (punch)
|UFC 198
|
|align=center|1
|align=center|2:47
|Curitiba, Brazil
|
|-
|Win
|align=center|14–2
|Andrei Arlovski
|TKO (punches)
|UFC 195
|
|align=center|1
|align=center|0:54
|Las Vegas, Nevada, U.S.
|
|-
|Win
|align=center|13–2
|Mark Hunt
|TKO (punches)
|UFC Fight Night: Miocic vs. Hunt
| 
|align=center|5
|align=center|2:47
|Adelaide, Australia
|
|-
|Loss
|align=center|12–2
|Junior dos Santos
|Decision (unanimous)
|UFC on Fox: dos Santos vs. Miocic
|
|align=center|5
|align=center|5:00
|Phoenix, Arizona, U.S.
|
|-
|Win
|align=center|12–1
|Fábio Maldonado
|TKO (punches)
|The Ultimate Fighter Brazil 3 Finale: Miocic vs. Maldonado
|
|align=center|1
|align=center|0:35
|São Paulo, Brazil
|
|-
|Win
|align=center|11–1
|Gabriel Gonzaga
|Decision (unanimous)
|UFC on Fox: Henderson vs. Thomson
|
|align=center|3
|align=center|5:00
|Chicago, Illinois, U.S.
|
|-
|Win
|align=center|10–1
|Roy Nelson
|Decision (unanimous)
|UFC 161
|
|align=center|3
|align=center|5:00
|Winnipeg, Manitoba, Canada
|
|-
|Loss
|align=center|9–1
|Stefan Struve
|TKO (punches)
|UFC on Fuel TV: Struve vs. Miocic
|
|align=center|2
|align=center|3:50
|Nottingham, England
|
|-
|Win
|align=center|9–0
|Shane del Rosario
|TKO (elbows)
|UFC 146
|
|align=center|2
|align=center|3:14
|Las Vegas, Nevada, U.S.
|
|-
|Win
|align=center|8–0
|Philip De Fries
|KO (punches)
|UFC on Fuel TV: Sanchez vs. Ellenberger
|
|align=center|1
|align=center|0:43
|Omaha, Nebraska, U.S.
|
|-
|Win
|align=center|7–0
|Joey Beltran
|Decision (unanimous)
|UFC 136
|
|align=center|3
|align=center|5:00
|Houston, Texas, U.S.
|
|-
|Win
|align=center|6–0
|Bobby Brents
|TKO (submission to leg kicks)
|NAAFS: Fight Night in the Flats 7
|
|align=center|2
|align=center|4:27
|Cleveland, Ohio, U.S.
|
|-
|Win
|align=center|5–0
|William Penn
|KO (punches)
|NAAFS: Caged Vengeance 9
|
|align=center|1
|align=center|2:23
|Cleveland, Ohio, U.S.
|
|-
|Win
|align=center|4–0
|Gregory Maynard
|TKO (punches)
|NAAFS: Night of Champions 2010
|
|align=center|2
|align=center|1:43
|Cleveland, Ohio, U.S.
|
|-
|Win
|align=center|3–0
|Jeremy Holm
|KO (punches)
|NAAFS: Rock N Rumble 4
|
|align=center|1
|align=center|1:36
|Cleveland, Ohio, U.S.
|
|-
|Win
|align=center|2–0
|Paul Barry
|TKO (punches)
|Moosin: God of Martial Arts
|
|align=center|2
|align=center|1:32
|Worcester, Massachusetts, U.S.
|
|-
|Win
|align=center|1–0
|Corey Mullis
|TKO (punches)
|NAAFS: Caged Fury 9
|
|align=center|1
|align=center|0:17
|Cleveland, Ohio, U.S.
|
|-

Pay-per-view bouts

See also 
List of current UFC fighters
List of male mixed martial artists
Ultimate Fighting Championship Pound for Pound rankings

References

External links 

1982 births
Living people
American male mixed martial artists
American people of Croatian descent
Cleveland State Vikings baseball players
Cleveland State Vikings wrestlers
Trevecca Nazarene Trojans baseball players
Coker University alumni
Heavyweight mixed martial artists
Mixed martial artists utilizing collegiate wrestling
Mixed martial artists from Ohio
People from Euclid, Ohio
Ultimate Fighting Championship champions
American male sport wrestlers
American firefighters
People from Independence, Ohio
Catholics from Ohio
Ultimate Fighting Championship male fighters
Paramedics